The Youth and Children's Orchestras Foundation of Chile (FOJI) is a non-profit organisation dedicated to the musical development of children and young adults in Chile.

History 

The first youth orchestra created in Chile and South America, date back to the 1960s with the one created in the city of La Serena, led by conductor and composer Jorge Peña Hen although this experience ended in 1973, will be and inspiration for the creation of FOJI.

FOJI begun in 2001 on the initiative of then first lady  Luisa Durán de Lagos and 2006 National price of Music and Arts master Fernando Rosas Pfingsthorn, the Foundation forms a part of the Sociocultural Directorate of the Chilean Presidential office.

Mission 

The Foundation's mission is "to elevate the social, cultural and educational development of Chile, offering opportunities so that children and young people from all over Chile improve their quality of life through being involved in orchestras". It offers 1,500 scholarships annually, favouring children from lower-income families.

Orchestras 
A large number of orchestras throughout Chile are managed through the Foundation.

National youth orchestra 
The National Youth Symphony Orchestra (OSNJ) is the Foundation's longest-running orchestra, founded in 1994. As the national youth orchestra of Chile, the orchestra has undertaken tours of Europe and also performed in neighbouring country Peru, among numerous national performances. In 2019, the orchestra debuted at Young Euro Classic.

Achievements 

Foji claim that their programme reaches more than 12,000 teens and children every year, and their orchestras perform concerts that reach an audience of almost a million.

See also 
 Music of Chile
 List of youth orchestras

References

External links 
 FOJI information and multimedia gallery

Organizations established in 2001
Organisations based in Santiago
Music organisations based in Chile
National youth orchestras
Music education organizations